Kosova, Bosnia and Herzegovina may refer to:

 Kosova (Maglaj), Bosnia and Herzegovina
 Kosova, Foča, Bosnia and Herzegovina